Niall Healy (born 14 April 1985) is an Irish sportsperson. He plays hurling with his local club Craughwell and was a member of the Galway senior inter-county team from 2005. Healy was top scorer in the 2015 galway senior hurling championship, scoring a total of 8-75 over 9 games. Healy damaged his cruciate ligament playing for his club Craughwell in May 2014 and would in turn miss the rest of the season.

Career statistics

Honours

Limerick Institute of Technology
Fitzgibbon Cup: 2007

Galway
Leinster Senior Hurling Championship: 2012
National Hurling League: 2010
All-Ireland Under-21 Hurling Championship: 2005

References

1985 births
Living people
Craughwell hurlers
Galway inter-county hurlers
Connacht inter-provincial hurlers